is a former Japanese football player and manager. who is becoming the assistant coach of the Myanmar national football team.

Playing career
Suzuki was born in Yamanashi Prefecture on January 1, 1955. After graduating from Nippon Sport Science University, he played for Yamaha Motors (later Júbilo Iwata) from 1977 to 1982.

Coaching career
After retirement, Suzuki started coaching career at Yamaha Motors in 1984. He served as a coach. In 2000, he was promoted to manager as Gjoko Hadžievski successor. In 2002, he led to the champions, and he resigned. He also managed September to November in 2004. In 2013, he became a manager for Japan U-20 national team. In 2018, he signed with J2 League club Albirex Niigata. However the club results were bad and he was sacked in August when the club at the 19th place of 22 clubs.

Managerial statistics

Honours

Manager
Júbilo Iwata
J1 League: 2002

Individual
J.League Manager of the Year: 2001, 2002

References

External links

1955 births
Living people
Nippon Sport Science University alumni
Association football people from Yamanashi Prefecture
Japanese footballers
Japan Soccer League players
Júbilo Iwata players
Japanese football managers
J1 League managers
J2 League managers
Júbilo Iwata managers
Albirex Niigata managers
Association football defenders